Tammy Ranae Buffum (Grand Rapids, 1966), known as Tammy Trent, is an American Christian singer. 

Buffum first became known as a state finalist in the Assemblies of God "Teen Talent Competition" in 1985. She is best known for the 2000 single "My Irreplaceable" which was No. 1 on the Christian chart.

On September 11, 2001, Buffum's husband died while on a missions trip, causing a temporary halt in her music career. In 2002, she became a speaker for the Extraordinary Women's conference and for the Women Of Faith conference.

Discography
Tammy Trent, R.E.X. Records 1995 - including the No. 1 song, "Your Love Is 4 Always" and three other Top 10 tunes.
You Have My Heart
Set You Free, Sparrow Records 2000
Sunny Days

References

1966 births
Living people
American performers of Christian music
Musicians from Grand Rapids, Michigan